Maria Gadú (born Mayra Corrêa Aygadoux, 4 December 1986) is a Brazilian singer, songwriter and guitarist. She has been nominated twice for a Latin Grammy Award. She released her first album in 2009, self-titled Maria Gadú. Her single "Shimbalaiê" became a number one hit in Italy during summer 2011, staying atop the FIMI chart for five straight weeks.

Biography
She started playing music as a child after having learned the basics of reading musical notation. Seven years later she began to record songs on cassette tapes. Her real musical training begins at the age of thirteen, when she began to give concerts in the bars of São Paulo, playing music by Adoniran Barbosa, Marisa Monte and Chico Buarque.

In 2008 she moved to Rio de Janeiro and began playing in bars, and she attracted the attention of famous musicians such as Caetano Veloso, Milton Nascimento, João Donato among others. Maria Gadu gained renown playing "Ne me quitte pas" by Jacques Brel for Jayme Monjardim, who was in preproduction of the television series Maysa: Quando Fala o Coração (Maysa – when the heart sings). Maysa Matarazzo, singer and mother of the director, had been very successful in the 1950s and 1960s singing this song, among others. Gadú's version was soon included in the soundtrack of the series that would premiere in January 2009. Gadú also had a small acting part in the series. As 2009 began, Maria Gadú prepared her first album for the Som Livre sublabel Slap. She currently sings "Blue Velvet" with Tony Bennett on his cd Viva Duets.

In 2015, her album Guelã was nominated for the 16th Latin Grammy Awards in the Best MPB Album category.

Discography

Albums

Video albums

Singles

References

1986 births
Living people
Lesbian musicians
Música Popular Brasileira singers
Brazilian people of French descent
Brazilian women guitarists
Brazilian LGBT singers
Singers from São Paulo
Latin music songwriters
21st-century Brazilian women singers
21st-century Brazilian singers
21st-century guitarists
Brazilian women singer-songwriters
20th-century LGBT people
21st-century LGBT people
Women in Latin music
LGBT people in Latin music
21st-century women guitarists